Knowledge Engineering Environment (KEE) is a frame-based development tool for expert systems. It was developed and sold by IntelliCorp, and first released in 1983. It ran on Lisp machines, and was later ported to Lucid Common Lisp with the CLX library, an X Window System (X11) interface for Common Lisp. This version was available on several different UNIX workstations.

On KEE, several extensions were offered:

 Simkit, a frame-based simulation library
 KEEconnection, database connection between the frame system and relational databases

In KEE, frames are called units. Units are used for both individual instances and classes. Frames have slots and slots have facets. Facets can describe, for example, a slot's expected values, its working value, or its inheritance rule. Slots can have multiple values. Behavior can be implemented using a message passing model.

KEE provides an extensive graphical user interface (GUI) to create, browse, and manipulate frames.

KEE also includes a frame-based rule system. In the KEE knowledge base, rules are frames. Both forward chaining and backward chaining inference are available.

KEE supports non-monotonic reasoning through the concepts of worlds. Worlds allow providing alternative slot-values of frames. Through an assumption-based truth or reason maintenance system, inconsistencies can be detected and analyzed.

ActiveImages allows graphical displays to be attached to slots of Units. Typical examples are buttons, dials, graphs, and histograms. The graphics are also implemented as Units via KEEPictures, a frame-based graphics library.

See also
 Expert system
 Frame language
 Inference engine
 IntelliCorp (software)
 Knowledge base
 Knowledge-based system
 Knowledge representation

References

External links
 An Assessment of Tools for Building Large Knowledge-Based Systems

Knowledge engineering
Knowledge representation
Common Lisp (programming language) software